The timber rattlesnake, canebrake rattlesnake, or banded rattlesnake (Crotalus horridus) is a species of pit viper endemic to eastern North America. Like all other pit vipers, it is venomous, with a very toxic bite. C. horridus is the only rattlesnake species in most of the populous Northeastern United States and is second only to its relatives to the west, the prairie rattlesnake, as the most northerly distributed venomous snake in North America. No subspecies are currently recognized.

Taxonomy
The timber rattlesnake was one of the many reptile species originally described by Carl Linnaeus in the landmark 1758 10th edition of his Systema Naturae, and still bears its original name Crotalus horridus.

The subspecies C. h. atricaudatus (Latreille in Sonnini and Latreille, 1802), often referred to as the canebrake rattlesnake, is currently considered invalid. Previously, it was recognized by Gloyd (1936) and Klauber (1936). Based on an analysis of geographic variation, Pisani et al. (1972) concluded no subspecies should be recognized. This was rejected by Conant (1975), but followed by Collins and Knight (1980). Brown and Ernst (1986) found evidence for retaining the two subspecies, but state  telling them apart without having more information than usual is not possible, including adult size, color pattern, the number of dorsal scale rows, and the number of ventral scales. Dundee and Rossman (1989) recognized C. h. atricaudatus, but others take a more neutral point of view.

The timber rattlesnake is one of 36 species in the genus Crotalus. This genus can be distinguished from Sistrurus by the small scales atop the head, rather than nine large scales found on Sistrurus.

Description

The dorsal scales are keeled and arranged in 21–26 scale rows at midbody (usually 25 rows in the southern part of its geographic range, and 23 rows in the northern part). The ventral scales number 158–177 in males and 163–183 in females. Males have 20–30 subcaudal scales, while females have 15–26. The rostral scale is normally a little higher than it is wide. In the internasal-prefrontal area there are 4–22 scales that include 2 large, triangular internasal scales that border the rostral, followed by two large, quadrangular prefrontal scales (anterior canthals) that may contact each other along the midline, or may be separated by many small scales. Between the supraocular and internasal scales, only a single canthal scale is present. Five to seven intersupraocular scales are seen. The number of prefoveal scales varies between two and eight. Usually, the first supralabial scale is in broad contact with the prenasal scale, although slightly to moderately separated along its posteroventral margin by the most anterior prefoveals.

Dorsally, they have a pattern of dark brown or black crossbands on a yellowish-brown or grayish background. The crossbands have irregular zig-zag edges, and may be V- or M-shaped. Often a rust-colored vertebral stripe is present. Ventrally, they are yellowish, uniform, or marked with black. Melanism is common, and some individuals are very dark, almost solid black.

Distribution and habitat
Timber rattlesnakes are present in the eastern United States from southern Minnesota and southern New Hampshire, south to East Texas and North Florida. One hundred and fifteen rattlesnakes have been marked within Brown County State Park in Indiana, one of the few places where they can be found in the state.

Its historic range includes southern Ontario and southern Quebec in Canada, but in May 2001, the Canadian Species at Risk Act listed it as extirpated in Canada. A Canadian government sponsored recovery strategy is under study to support the reintroducing of this predator of many pests to its former Canadian habitat.

Many were present in some of the thick forest areas of central and southeastern Iowa, mostly within the Mississippi, Skunk, Iowa, and Des Moines River valleys, in several places in these areas; bites from timber rattlesnakes have been widespread, especially in a localized area of Geode State Park, in southeastern Henry County, along Credit Island Park, in southern Scott County, and in the forested areas of southern Clinton County.
The museum at Amana Colony, Iowa, asserts that one founding family lost their firstborn, a daughter, at the age of three, due to a rattlesnake bite she received while playing on a woodpile in the 19th century.

In Pennsylvania, it is not heavily present west of Chestnut Ridge, which is in the Laurel Highlands, nor is it heavily present in the more urban areas of the southeastern corner of the state. Thus, its range does not include  Philadelphia and Pittsburgh, the two largest cities in Pennsylvania.

In New York, timber rattlesnakes are "extirpated at 26% of historically known dens, and nearly extirpated at another 5%". Brown (1984, 1988) suggested denning populations in New York have been reduced by 50 to 75% of their historical numbers.

C. horridus is extirpated from Michigan, Delaware, Maine and Rhode Island, and is considered close to extirpation in New Hampshire.

In Massachusetts, the snakes are active from mid-May to mid-October. Early settlers were afraid of the snake, as its population was widespread throughout the state. The town of Westborough paid 13 men two shillings per day to rid a local hill of snakes in 1680. The hill had so many rattlesnakes, it was named "Boston Hill" because the number of snakes killed rivaled the population of the young city of Boston. In Milford, men would hunt the rattlesnakes between May and early June. According to Adin Ballou, when he arrived in town in 1824 snakes were still abundant, by 1881 they were still reported in some areas of town. Since that time their habitat has been reduced to the Blue Hills south of Boston, the Berkshires in Western Massachusetts, and parts of the Connecticut River Valley, notably in the area of the Holyoke Range. The snake is so rare in the state that it is rarely encountered by people and is considered endangered, making it illegal to harass, kill, collect, or possess. In September 2021, a five-foot long timber rattlesnake was recorded on video on a trail in the Blue Hills Reservation.

Generally, this species is found in deciduous forests in rugged terrain. During the summer, gravid (pregnant) females seem to prefer open, rocky ledges where the temperatures are higher, while males and nongravid females tend to spend more time in cooler, denser woodland with more closed forest canopy.

Behavior
Female timber rattlers often bask in the sun before giving birth, in open rocky areas known as "basking knolls".

During the winter, timber rattlesnakes brumate in dens and limestone crevices, often together with copperheads and black rat snakes.

Males often mate farther away from winter hibernacula than females.

A lifetime reproduction study of a population in the Adirondack Mountains of New York found that the first reproduction occurs at a mean age of 9.6 years. The mean length of reproductive cycles is 4.2 years, the mean reproductive life span is 9.6 years, and the average fecundity is 7.7 offspring per litter. Nonviable offspring were found in 20% of the field litters. Most females only reproduced one. Macrogeographic differences were observed within the population and may have correlated resource levels influencing growth rates and additionally human encounters could influence survival.

Feeding
Their prey are mainly small mammals, but may include small birds, frogs, and other small animals, including other snakes. Although capable of consuming other rattlesnakes, the most common snake they prey upon are garter snakes. Like most rattlesnakes, timber rattlesnakes are known to use chemical cues to find sites to ambush their prey and  often strike their prey and track them until they can be consumed. Timber rattlesnakes are known to use fallen logs as a waiting site for prey to pass by, giving them an elevated perch from which to effectively strike their prey, which is almost entirely terrestrial rather than arboreal (even arboreal prey such as squirrels tend to be caught when they come to the ground). If the arboreal prey (squirrels) are in the trees, it was found that the snake might indicate vertical tree posture, meaning it leans up against a tree looking at the squirrel and waiting for it to come down. The primary foods by genera of timber rattlesnakes were as follows: Peromyscus (33.3%), Microtus (10.9%), Tamias (qv) (10.6%), Sylvilagus (10.4%), Sigmodon (5.3%) and Sciurus (4.2%). Based on examination of the snout-to-vent length,  juvenile timber rattlesnakes were found to differ slightly in dietary preferences from adult rattlesnakes, being more likely to consume smaller prey such as shrews (averaging  and unable to attack subadult eastern cottontail rabbits (averaging  but Peromyscus was the number one prey item for both young and adult rattlesnakes. Several birds, although always secondary to mammals, are also known to be hunted, mainly ground-dwelling species such as bobwhites, but also a surprising number of passerines.

Venom
Potentially, this is one of North America's most dangerous snakes, due to its long fangs, impressive size, and high venom yield. This is to some degree offset by its relatively mild disposition and long brumation period. Before striking, they often perform a good deal of preliminary rattling and feinting. Cist (1845) described how he lived in western Pennsylvania for many years, and the species was quite common there, but in all that time, he heard of only a single death resulting from its bite.

Considerable geographic and ontogenetic variation occurs regarding the toxicity of the venom, which can be said for many rattlesnake species. Four venom patterns have been described for this species: Type A is largely neurotoxic, and is found in various parts of the southern range. One effect of the toxin can be generalized myokymia. Type B is hemorrhagic and proteolytic, and is found consistently in the north and in parts of the southeast. Type A + B is found in areas where the aforementioned types apparently intergrade in southwestern Arkansas and northern Louisiana. Type C venom has none of the above components and is relatively weak.

The neurotoxic component of the type A venom is referred to as canebrake toxin, and is a phospholipase A2. It is analogous to the neurotoxins found in the venoms of several other rattlesnake species, and when present, contributes significantly to the overall toxicity. Other components found in the venom include a small basic peptide that works as a myotoxin, a fibrinogen-clotting enzyme that can produce defibrination syndrome, and a bradykinin-releasing enzyme.

CroFab antivenom, while not specific for C. horridus, is used to treat envenomations from this species.

Symbol
The timber rattlesnake was designated the state reptile of West Virginia in 2008.  That state's legislature praised "...a proud contribution by the eighth grade class at Romney Middle School, from West Virginia's oldest county, in West Virginia's oldest town, to have been instrumental in making the timber rattlesnake the state reptile..."

This snake became a prominent symbol of American anger and resolve during the American Revolution due to its fearsome reputation. In the 18th century, European-trained doctors and scientists had little firsthand experience with or information on timber rattlesnakes, and treatment of their bites was poorly effective. The motto Nemo me impune lacesset (with the verb in the future tense) appears above a Crotalus horridus on a 1778 $20 bill from Georgia as an early example of the colonial use of the coiled rattlesnake symbol, which later became famous on the Gadsden flag.

Conservation status
This species is classified as least concern on the IUCN Red List (assessed in 2007). Species are listed as such due to their wide distribution, presumed large population, or because they are unlikely to be declining fast enough to qualify for listing in a more threatened category.

The timber rattlesnake is listed as endangered in New Jersey, Ohio, Vermont, Connecticut, Massachusetts, Virginia, Indiana, New York, Illinois, and New Hampshire.

Timber rattlesnakes have already been extirpated in Maine and Rhode Island and only one population remains in New Hampshire. They are protected in many of the Appalachian states, but their populations continue to decline.

See also
 Snakebite

References

 Goetz, S. M., Petersen, C. E., Rose, R. K., Kleopfer, J. D., & Savitzky, A. H. (2016). Diet and Foraging Behaviors of Timber Rattlesnakes, Crotalus horridus, in Eastern Virginia. Journal of Herpetology, 50(4), 520–526. https://doi.org/10.1670/15-086

Further reading

Brown CW, Ernst CH (1986). "A Study of Variation in Eastern Timber Rattlesnakes, Crotalus horridus Linnae (Serpentes, Viperidae)". Brimleyana 12: 57–74.

Cist C (1845). The Cincinnati Miscellany or Antiquities of the West. vol. 1. Cincinnati. 272 pp.
Collins JT, Knight JL (1980). "Crotalus horridus Linnaeus. Timber rattlesnake". Catalogue of American Amphibians and Reptiles. 253.1 – 253.2.
Conant R, Bridges W (1939).What Snake Is That? A Field Guide to the Snakes of the United States East of the Rocky Mountains. (with 108 drawings by Edmond Malnate). New York and London: D. Appleton-Century Company. Frontispiece map + viii + 163 pp. + Plates A-C, 1-32. (Crotalus h. horridus, pp. 149–151 + Plate 31, figures 88A & 89; C. h. atricaudatus, pp. 151–152 + Plate 31, figures 88B & 88C).
Gloyd HK (1936). "The cane-brake rattlesnake". Copeia 1935 (4): 175–178.
Holt EG (1924). "Additional records for the Alabama herpetological catalogue". Copeia 1924: 100–101.
Hubbs B, O'Connor B (2001). A Guide to Rattlesnakes and other Venomous Serpents of the United States. Tempe, Arizona: Tricolor Books. 129 pp. . (Crotalus horridus, pp. 68–71).
Klauber LM (1936). "Key to the rattlesnakes with summary of characteristics". Trans. San Diego Soc. Nat. Hist. 8 (2): 185–176.
Klauber LM (1956). Rattlesnakes: Their Habitats, Life Histories, and Influence on Mankind. 2 volumes. Berkeley: University of California Press. 1,476 pp.
Linnaeus C (1758). Systema naturæ per regna tria naturæ, secundum classes, ordines, genera, species, cum characteribus, differentiis, synonymis, locis. Tomus I. Editio Decima, Reformata [Volume I, Tenth Edition, Revised]. Stockholm: L. Salvius. (Crotalus horridus, new species, p. 214). (in Latin).
McCoy CJ (1980). Identification Guide to Pennsylvania Snakes. (Design and illustrations by Michael Antonoplos). Pittsburgh, Pennsylvania: Carnegie Museum of Natural History. 12 pp. (Crotalus horridus, pp. 10–11).
Morris PA (1948). Boy's Book of Snakes: How to Recognize and Understand Them. (A volume of the Humanizing Science Series, edited by Jaques Cattell). New York: Ronald Press. viii + 185 pp. (Crotalus h. horridus, pp. 94–97, 181; C. h. atricaudatus, pp. 98, 181).
Netting MG, Richmond ND (editors) (1970). Pennsylvania Reptiles and Amphibians. Third Edition, Fifth Printing. (Photographs by Hal H. Harrison). Harrisburg, Pennsylvania: Pennsylvania Fish Commission. 24 pp. (Crotalus horridus, pp. 7–8 + front cover painting by Ned Smith).
Pisani GR, Collins JT, Edwards SR (1972). "A re-evaluation of the subspecies of Crotalus horridus. Trans. Kansas Acad. Sci. 75: 255–263.
Powell R, Conant R, Collins JT (2016). Peterson Field Guide to Reptiles and Amphibians of Eastern and Central North America, Fourth Edition. Boston and New York: Houghton Mifflin Harcourt. xiv + 494 pp., 47 plates, 207 figures. . (Crotalus horridus, pp. 440–441 + Plate 46 + Figure 168 on p. 356). 
Schmidt KP (1953). A Check List of North American Amphibians and Reptiles, Sixth Edition. Chicago: American Society of Ichthyologists and Herpetologists. 280 pp.
Smith HM, Brodie ED Jr (1982). Reptiles of North America: A Guide to Field Identification. New York: Golden Press. 240 pp.  (paperback),  (hardcover). (Crotalus horridus, pp. 206–207).

External links

 Account of severe C. horridus envenomation at venomousreptiles.org. Accessed 12 December 2007.
 Snakes of Louisiana at Kingsnake.com. Accessed 7 August 2007.
 Timber rattlesnake at Reptiles and Amphibians of Iowa.

horridus
Snakes of North America
Reptiles of Canada
Extinct animals of Canada
Reptiles of the United States
Fauna of the Eastern United States
Symbols of West Virginia
Reptiles described in 1758
Taxa named by Carl Linnaeus